Brunoy is a RER station in Brunoy, Essonne, Île-de-France, France. The station was opened in 1852 and is on the Paris–Marseille railway. The RER Line D, which is operated by the SNCF, serves the station.

Station Info
Built and designed by the architect François-Alexis Cendrier at an altitude of 58 meters above sea level, Brunoy station is at the 21.102 kilometer point of the Paris-Marseille railway, in between the stations of Yerres and Boussy-Saint-Antoine. By the estimations of SNCF in 2016, around 4,276,800 people use the station annually.

Train Services
The following RER D train services serve the station:
Local services (RER D) Goussainville–Saint-Denis–Gare de Lyon–Villeneuve-Saint-Georges–Brunoy–Combs-la-Ville–Quincy–Melun
Local services (RER D) Gare de Lyon–Creteil-Pompadour–Villeneuve-Saint-Georges–Brunoy–Combs-la-Ville–Quincy–Melun

References

External links

 
 

Railway stations in Essonne
Réseau Express Régional stations
Railway stations in France opened in 1852